Severn Ham, Tewkesbury is a  biological Site of Special Scientific Interest in Gloucestershire near Tewkesbury, notified in 1974.

It is on the east side of the Severn to Old River Severn, Upper Lode SSSI.

Habitat and flora
The site is important for protection being one of the few remaining ham meadows which are traditionally managed. It is sited on the alluvium of the Severn Vale and is a flooded area in the winter months.  It is neutral grassland and mostly only semi-improved. There are specific requirements in respect of fertilisers for the site to ensure the protection of the wide-ranging flora.  This includes the rare sulphurwort (Oenanthe silaifolia).

Grass species include cocksfoot, meadow foxtail, meadow barley, and smooth brome (Bromus racemosus). There is marsh foxtail in the wetter areas.

Flowering species such as meadow buttercup and lady's smock are plentiful. Trees and scrub grow on the margins.

Fauna
Resident birds include lapwing, curlew and redshank.

References

SSSI Source
 Natural England SSSI information on the citation
 Natural England SSSI information on the Severn Ham, Tewkesbury units

External links
 Natural England (SSSI information)
 Tewkesbury Medieval Town Showcase

Sites of Special Scientific Interest in Gloucestershire
Sites of Special Scientific Interest notified in 1974